Arth is a village in Switzerland.

Arth may also refer to:

People
 Jeanne Arth (born 1935), tennis player
 Tom Arth (born 1981), American football coach and former player

Other
 Arth (film), 1982 Indian film by Mahesh Bhatt
 Arth - The Destination, 2017 Pakistani film by Shaan Shahid, remake of the Indian film
Artham, 1988 Indian film
 Arth-Goldau railway station, in Switzerland
 Dyffryn Arth, community in Wales
 River Arth, in Wales

See also

Anth (disambiguation)
Arta (disambiguation)
Artha, Indian philosophical term
Arthashastra, ancient Indian treatise

Surnames from nicknames